Hamza Rafia (born 22 April 1999) is a Tunisian professional footballer who plays as an attacking midfielder for Italian  club Pescara and the Tunisia national team.

Born in Tunisia, Rafia initially represented France at youth level, before switching allegiance to his native country, making his senior debut for Tunisia in 2019.

Early life
Born on 22 April 1999 in Kalaat es Senam, Tunisia, Rafia moved to France as a child and played in the youth sectors of Bron Terraillon, Bron Grand Lyon, and Lyon.

Club career

Lyon B
Coming through the youth system, Rafia played for the reserve team of Lyon in the Championnat de France Amateur, the fourth division of French football. He made his debut on 28 May 2016, during the 2015–16 season, in a 4–3 home defeat to Moulins Yzeure Foot. His first goal for Lyon B came during the 2018–19 season, on 18 August 2018, helping his side win 5–2 against Monaco B. Rafia scored five goals in 18 league games throughout the season. In four seasons, he scored five goals in 26 games.

Juventus U23
On 16 July 2019, Rafia joined Juventus on a three-year contract, for a fee of €400,000, which can reach €5 million in add-ons, and 20% on his future sale. Rafia played for Juventus' reserve team in the Serie C – Juventus U23 – making his professional debut in a 2–0 away loss to Novara in the league on 26 August 2019.

On 18 December, Rafia scored his first goal for Juventus U23 in a 2–1 away victory over Piacenza, in the quarter-finals of the Coppa Italia Serie C. He helped Juventus U23 win the tournament, scoring against Ternana in the final, which ended 2–1. During the 2019–20 season, Rafia played 20 games in the league, two in the promotion play-offs, and scored three goals and made three assists in the Coppa Italia Serie C. On 29 November 2020, Rafia scored his first goal in Serie C in a 2–1 away loss against Olbia.

Juventus
On 13 January 2021, Rafia made his senior debut for Juventus, coming on as a 77th-minute substitute in a Coppa Italia match against Genoa; he scored in the 104th minute, helping Juventus win 3–2 after extra time.

Loan to Standard Liège 
On 18 August 2021, Rafia moved to Belgian side Standard Liège on loan.

Loan to Cremonese
On 31 January 2022, Rafia moved to Serie B side Cremonese.

Pescara
On 27 January 2023, Rafia signed a 2.5-year contract with Serie C club Pescara.

International career
Rafia represented France at under-17 and under-18 levels, but decided to represent Tunisia at senior level. He made his senior debut on 6 September 2019, coming off the bench in a 1–0 friendly win over Mauritania.

Style of play
Rafia is an attacking midfielder also capable of playing as a right winger.

Career statistics

Club

Honours
Juventus U23
 Coppa Italia Serie C: 2019–20

Juventus
 Coppa Italia: 2020–21

References

External links
 
 
 

1999 births
Living people
People from Kef Governorate
Tunisian emigrants to France
Tunisian footballers
French footballers
Association football midfielders
Olympique Lyonnais players
Juventus Next Gen players
Juventus F.C. players
Standard Liège players
U.S. Cremonese players
Delfino Pescara 1936 players
Championnat National 2 players
Serie B players
Serie C players
Belgian Pro League players
France youth international footballers
Tunisia international footballers
Tunisian expatriate footballers
Tunisian expatriate sportspeople in Italy
Tunisian expatriate sportspeople in Belgium
French expatriate footballers
French expatriate sportspeople in Italy
French expatriate sportspeople in Belgium
Expatriate footballers in Italy
Expatriate footballers in Belgium
2021 Africa Cup of Nations players